Khatir or Khater may refer to:

People
 Khatir Afridi (1929–1968), Pakistani poet
 Khatir Ghaznavi (1925–2008), Pakistani writer, poet, and research scholar
 Ahmed Abu Khater, Palestinian and American architect
 Subait Khater (born 1980), Emirati footballer
 Ahmed Abu Khatir (born 1975) Emirati Nasheed singer
 Outhman Khatir (born 1991), Chadian footballer

Places
 Kardgar Khatir, an Iranian village
 Khatir Kola, an Iranian village

Other uses
 ; see Warid (Sufism)
 Al Khater, an Arabic tribe

See also
 Aap Ki Khatir (disambiguation), several Iranian movies